Love at First Hate (Love at First Hate – ) is a 2018 Thai television series starring Yuke Songpaisan (Son) and Worranit Thawornwong (Mook).

Produced by GMMTV together with On & On Infinity, the series was one of the ten television series for 2018 showcased by GMMTV in their "Series X" event on 1 February 2018. It premiered on One31 and LINE TV on 14 September 2018, airing on Fridays at 22:00 ICT and 23:00 ICT, respectively. The series concluded on 7 December 2018.

The series was rerun on GMM 25 from 30 April 2019 to 11 June 2019, airing on Mondays and Tuesdays at 21:25 ICT.

Cast and characters 
Below are the cast of the series:

Main 
 Yuke Songpaisan (Son) as Paniti / Dr. Pup
 Worranit Thawornwong (Mook) as Kluay

Supporting 
 Carissa Springett as Ploy
 Weerayut Chansook (Arm) as Tawan
 Sivakorn Lertchuchot (Guy) as Dr. Oh
 Seo Ji Yeon as Soncha
 Watchara Sukchum (Jennie) as Joob
 Phakjira Kanrattanasood (Nanan) as Dr. Mint
 Apasiri Nitibhon (Um) as Mae Napa
 Thanongsak Suphakan (Nong)
 Prachakorn Piyasakulkaew (Sun) as Dr. Golf

Soundtracks

References

External links 
 Love at First Hate on One31 website 
 Love at First Hate on GMM 25 website 
 Love at First Hate on LINE TV
 GMMTV

Television series by GMMTV
Thai romantic comedy television series
Thai drama television series
2018 Thai television series debuts
2018 Thai television series endings
One 31 original programming